Eisenbach may refer to:

Eisenbach, a town in Baden-Württemberg, Germany  
Eisenbach (Breg), a river in Baden-Württemberg, Germany
Eisenbach (Emsbach), a river in Hesse, Germany